Sprint Applied Research & Advanced Technology Labs (Sprint ATL/Sprint Labs) is Sprint Nextel research facility located in Burlingame, CA.

See also
 Sprint Nextel
 Nextel Communications
 WiMAX
 Clearwire
 Open Handset Alliance

References

External links
Sprint ATL Website

Companies based in Burlingame, California
Sprint Corporation
Research organizations in the United States